CareRooms is a British company based in Cambridge, operating in Cambridgeshire and Surrey. CareRooms are attempting to deliver an alternative to extended stays in hospital and residential homes for elderly people. It has been said they are attempting transfer the concept of Airbnb into the health and social care sector, however there are noticeable differences between this scheme and Airbnb.  Their plan is to arrange rooms in private homes for patients who do not need to be in hospital but are not able to return to their own homes. It has been characterised as "CareBnB".

CareRooms pay "Hosts" up to £50 per night. The "Host" will receive no care training, with this instead being provided by regulatory domiciliary care agencies. "Hosts" will only provide the room and heat pre-prepared meals as well as offering conversation and companionship to the "Guest" staying with them.

Safeguarding concerns came to light in October 2018  and CareRooms responded by saying that all Hosts complete training on 'Adult Safeguarding, Food Safety, Cleaning for Infection Control, and the Mental Health Capacity Act, as well as having to be DBS checked'.  Rachel Clarke complained that "Urgent investment in trained, regulated carers is the only safe way to address this, not outsourcing the problem to random homeowners with no clearly defined standards for safeguarding, clinical governance and infection control, not to mention other risks to patients who are at their most vulnerable."

A similar but unrelated scheme is being proposed in Utrecht, Netherlands.

In March 2018 Cambridgeshire County Council announced an exploratory deal which will only involve low acuity self funding patients. There would not be any contractual arrangement with the council.  Homeowners would be paid £50 a night and the company would provide any necessary equipment.  Each placement would have biometric monitoring and instant access to a video GP service.  The hosts would have to go through a vetting and training process.  If care - above a room and meals - is required it will be provided by a regulated care provider.   Chief executive Paul Gaudin claims the environment would be much safer than the current facilities that patients are often discharged into. Chairwoman of the council committee Anna Bailey states they 'have not committed to piloting CareRooms, but we think the innovative concept is interesting and worth exploring...We would like to give CareRooms the space to explore its concept.

Councillor Sandra Crawford from Cambridge County Council has said a discussion for CareRooms is needed to be 'scrutinised' by all (councillors, NHS Trusts, social care providers etc). Mr Gaudin says he welcomes a discussion and said it was not about 'playing politics' but instead getting 'communities to support each other as much as possible'.

North Yorkshire County Council and City of York Council sponsored an expansion of the scheme in Selby and York in 2021 to help people recover after being discharged from hospital. Tele-care and monitoring equipment is fitted in the rooms to ensure guests vital signs are checked and there is 24-hour video access to a GP service.  It was said to make use of the "resources that exist within local communities" in a report proposing further expansion to Richmond, Scarborough and Whitby.

See also
Private healthcare in the United Kingdom

References

External links
 Official website

Health care companies of England
Social care in England